is a Japanese professional shogi player ranked 5-dan.

Early life and education
Koga was born in Fukuoka, Japan on February 13, 1996. He learned how to play shogi from his grandfather when he was about four years old.

Shogi

Apprentice professional
Koga entered the Japan Shogi Association's apprentice school in September 2011 as a protegee of shogi professional Isao Nakata. He was promoted to the rank of apprentice professional 3-dan in April 2017 and obtained full professional status and the rank of 4-dan after finishing third in the 67th 3-dan League (April 2020September 2020) with a record of 13 wins and 5 losses. Although Koga's third place finish was not sufficient to earn him direct promotion to 4-dan, it was good enough to earn him a second promotion point which gave him the option to enter the professional ranks as a free class player. After consulting with his mentor Nakata, Koga decided he wanted to turn professional even if it meant starting in the Free Class.

Regular professional
In September 2021, Koga was promoted to Meijin Class C2 after defeating Hirotaka Kajiura 7-dan to reach the finals of the  52nd  tournament. Koga's victory meant that he satisfied the criteria for promotion to Class C2 for the 80th Meijin League (April 2022March 2023).

Promotion history
The promotion history for Koga is as follows.
6-kyū: September 2011
3-dan: April 2017
4-dan: October 1, 2020
5-dan: March 14, 2023

Notes

References

External links
 ShogiHub: Professional Player Info · Koga, Yusei

Living people
2001 births
Japanese shogi players
Professional shogi players
People from Fukuoka
Professional shogi players from Fukuoka Prefecture